The long-furred Atlantic tree-rat or Thomas's Atlantic tree-rat (Phyllomys medius), is a spiny rat species found in Brazil. In recent years, this species have unveiled itself in different parts of Brazil where researchers and scientists are still closely looking into due to lack of knowledge on this species. The Phyllomys medius  is closely related to two other species that have recently been connected to the long furred Atlantic tree rat due to similarities in physical characteristics and DNA. (Yuri et.al., 2008) (Edson et al., 2018)

References
Edson Fiedler de Abreu-Júnior, Alexandre Reis Percequillo, Lena Geise, Yuri L.R. Leite, Ana Carolina Loss. (2018) Unveiling the identity of Kerr's Atlantic tree rat, Phyllomys kerri (Rodentia, Echimyidae). Mammalian Biology, Vol. 92, 57-70. https://doi.org/10.1016/j.mambio.2018.03.008

Yuri L. R. Leite, Alexandre U. Christoff, Valéria Fagundes, A New Species of Atlantic Forest Tree Rat, Genus Phyllomys (Rodentia, Echimyidae) from Southern Brazil, Journal of Mammalogy, Volume 89, Issue 4, 15 August 2008, Pages 845–851, https://doi.org/10.1644/07-MAMM-A-343.1

Phyllomys
Mammals described in 1909
Taxa named by Oldfield Thomas